Trachypepla conspicuella is a species of moth in the family Oecophoridae. It is endemic to New Zealand and is found in both the North and South Islands. It is similar in appearance to its close relative T. euryleucota but tends to be paler. Its colouration imitates bird droppings. Larvae feed on leaf litter. Adults of this species are on the wing from November to February and have been observed resting on fences and walls.

Taxonomy
This species was first described by Francis Walker in 1864 and named Gelechia conspicuella using specimens collected in Nelson by T. R. Oxley. In 1875 Baron Cajetan von Felder and Alois Friedrich Rogenhofer, thinking they were describing a new species, illustrated and named this species as Gelechia taongella. In 1884 Edward Meyrick placed G. conspicuella within the genus Trachypepla and at the same time synonymised G. taongella. George Hudson discussed and illustrated this species in his 1928 book The butterflies and moths of New Zealand. The lectotype specimen is held at the Natural History Museum, London.

Description

Walker described the adults of this species as follows:

This species is variable in appearance but can be recognised by its brown thorax and pale basal patch. Darker specimens of this species can be confused with specimens of T. euryleucota. Hudson was of the opinion that the colouration of T. conspicuella imitates bird droppings.

Distribution
This species is endemic to New Zealand and can be found in the North and South Islands. Other than the type locality of Nelson, this species has been collected at Wellington, Christchurch and Lake Wakatipu.

Host species 

Meyrick hypothesised that the larvae of this species may feed on moss. However the larvae of T. conspicuella have been observed as feeding on leaf litter. They have also been observed emerging from "nests" built by the larvae of Hierodoris atychioides.

Behaviour 
Adults are on the wing from November to February. This moth is frequently observed resting on human made structures such as fences or walls and is known to enter houses.

References 

Moths described in 1864
Oecophorinae
Moths of New Zealand
Endemic fauna of New Zealand
Taxa named by Francis Walker (entomologist)
Endemic moths of New Zealand